GP1, GP-1, GP.1, GP 1 or variants may refer to:

Science and technology
 Get Password 1 (computer virus)

Astronomy
 GP1, IAU Minor Planet Center notation for small solar system bodies
 (48689) 1996 GP1 aka "1996 GP1"
 (6327) 1991 GP1 aka "1991 GP1"

Vehicles
 Gehrlein GP-1, midwing sailplane "GP-1" manufactured by Gehrlein
 González Gil-Pazó GP-1, trainer aircraft
 Petronas FP1, a sport bike, original name GP1
 GP1, an English Racing Automobiles E-type racecar
 GP1, a Soviet gas turbine-electric locomotive design

Video games
 Grand Prix 1, a Formula One video game by Microprose 
 GP-1, a motorcycle racing video game Atlus

Other uses
 Canon de 75 mle GP1, a Belgian 75mm cannon
 GP1, a High Efficiency Video Coding processor used by GoPro
 GP1, (Gesellenprüfung Teil 1) Zwischenprüfung Der KFZ - Mechatroniker Ausbildung.

See also

 MotoGP, motorcycle GP class 1
 Formula 1, racecar GP class 1
 
 GPA (disambiguation)
 GPI (disambiguation)
 GP (disambiguation)